is an underground metro station located in Izumi-ku, Yokohama, Kanagawa, Japan operated by the Yokohama Municipal Subway’s Blue Line (Line 1). It is 3.7 kilometers from the terminus of the Blue Line at Shōnandai Station.

History
Tateba Station was opened on August 29, 1999. Platform screen doors were installed in September 2007.

Lines
Yokohama Municipal Subway
Blue Line

Station layout
Tateba Station has a single underground island platform, located two stories underneath a large above-ground station building.

Platforms

References
 Harris, Ken and Clarke, Jackie. Jane's World Railways 2008-2009. Jane's Information Group (2008).

External links
 Tateba Station (Blue Line) 

Railway stations in Kanagawa Prefecture
Railway stations in Japan opened in 1999
Blue Line (Yokohama)